A helium mass spectrometer is an instrument commonly used to detect and locate small leaks. It was initially developed in the Manhattan Project during World War II to find extremely small leaks in the gas diffusion process of uranium enrichment plants. It typically uses a vacuum chamber in which a sealed container filled with helium is placed. Helium leaks out of the container, and the rate of the leak is detected by a mass spectrometer.

Detection technique 
Helium is used as a tracer because it penetrates small leaks rapidly. Helium also has the properties of being non-toxic, chemically inert and present in the atmosphere only in minute quantities (5 ppm). Typically a helium leak detector will be used to measure leaks in the range of 10 to 10 Pa·m·s.

A flow of 10 Pa·m·s is about 0.006 ml per minute at standard conditions for temperature and pressure (STP).

A flow of 10 Pa·m·s is about 0.003 ml per century at STP.

Types of leaks 
Typically there are two types of leaks in the detection of helium as a tracer for leak detection: residual leak and virtual leak. A residual leak is a real leak due to an imperfect seal, a puncture, or some other hole in the system. A virtual leak is the semblance of a leak in a vacuum system caused by outgassing of chemicals trapped or adhered to the interior of a system that is actually sealed. As the gases are released into the chamber, they can create a false positive indication of a residual leak in the system.

Uses 
Helium mass spectrometer leak detectors are used in production line industries such as refrigeration and air conditioning, automotive parts, carbonated beverage containers food packages and aerosol packaging, as well as in the manufacture of steam products, gas bottles, fire extinguishers, tire valves, and numerous other products including all vacuum systems.

Test methods

Global helium spray 
This method requires the part to be tested to be connected to a helium leak detector. The outer surface of the part to be tested will be located in some kind of a tent in which the helium concentration will be raised to 100% helium.

If the part is small the vacuum system included in the leak testing instrument will be able to reach low enough pressure to allow for mass spectrometer operation.

If the size of the part is too large, an additional vacuum pumping system may be required to reach low enough pressure in a reasonable length of time. Once operating pressure has been reached, the mass spectrometer can start its measuring operation.

If leakage is encountered the small and "agile" molecules of helium will migrate through the cracks into the part. The vacuum system will carry any tracer gas molecule into the analyzer cell of the magnetic sector mass spectrometer. A signal will inform the operator of the value of the leakage encountered.

Local helium spray 
This method is a small variation from the one above.
It still requires the part to be tested to be connected to a helium leak detector. The outer surface of the part to be tested is sprayed with a localized stream of helium tracer gas.

If the part is small the vacuum system included in the instrument will be able to reach low enough pressure to allow for mass spectrometer operation.

If the size of the part is too large, an additional pumping system may be required to reach low enough pressure in a reasonable length of time. Once operating pressure has been reached, the mass spectrometer can start its measuring operation.

If leakage is encountered the small and "agile" molecules of helium will migrate through the cracks into the part. The vacuum system will carry any tracer gas molecule into the analyzer cell of the magnetic sector mass spectrometer. A signal will inform the operator of the value of the leakage encountered. Thus correlation between maximum leakage signal and location of helium spray head will allow the operator to pinpoint the leaky area.

Helium charged vacuum test 
In this case the part is pressurized (sometime this test is combined with a burst test, i.e. at 40 bar) with helium while sitting in a vacuum chamber. The vacuum chamber is connected to a vacuum pumping system and a leak detector. Once the vacuum has reached the mass spectrometer operating pressure, any helium leakage will be measured.
This test method applies to a lot of components that will operate under pressure: airbag canisters, evaporators, condensers, high-voltage SF6 filled switchgear.

Partial vacuum method (ultra sniffer test) 
In contrast to the Helium charged sniffer test, the partial vacuum method, the ultra sniffer test gas method (UST-method) uses the partial vacuum effect, so that the gas tightness of test sample can be detected at normal pressure with the same sensitivity as the helium charged vacuum test with helium gas helium. The method has a sensitivity of 10 Pa·m·s.
Similar to the classical Helium charged sniffer test the test sample is enclosed in a bag, but in contrast to the classic method, the bag is exposed with a helium-free gas, so that the helium concentration inside the bag can reduced from 5·10 to 10 Pa·m·s. This sensitivity corresponds to a theoretical gas loss of 1 cm in 3000 years.

The UST method can be used very economically for the ad hoc testing of test samples. The test system can be set up easily, with normal pneumatic items, such as valves and plastic hoses. For the embedding of the test samples, a simple plastic bag is sufficient. The UST method was also used for the leak testing of component of the fusion experiment Wendelstein 7-X in Germany.

Bombing test 
This method applies to objects that are supposedly sealed.

First the device under test will be exposed for an extended length of time to a high helium pressure in a "bombing" chamber.

If the part is leaky, helium will be able to penetrate the device.

Later the device will be placed in a vacuum chamber, connected to a vacuum pump and a mass spectrometer. The tiny amount of gas that entered the device under pressure will be released in the vacuum chamber and sent to the mass spectrometer where the leak rate will be measured.

This test method applies to implantable medical devices, crystal oscillator, saw filter devices.

This method is not able to detect a massive leak as the tracer gas will be quickly pumped out when test chamber is pumped down.

Helium charged sniffer test 
In this last case the part is pressurized with helium. The mass spectrometer is fitted with a special device, a sniffer probe, that allows it to sample air (and tracer gas when confronted with a leak) at atmospheric pressure and to bring it into the mass spectrometer.

This mode of operation is frequently used to locate a leak that has been detected by other methods, in order to allow for parts repair. Modern machines can digitally remove the helium two decades below the background level and thus it is now possible detect leaks as small as 5·10 Pa·m·s in sniffing mode.

See also 
 Mass spectrometry
 Tracer-gas leak testing
 Leak noise correlator
 Helium analyzer

References

External links
 Test of medical devices (FDA)
 Leak Detection
 UST method

Mass spectrometry
Vacuum systems